Home in Oklahoma  is a 1946 American Western film starring Roy Rogers.

Cast
Roy Rogers - himself
Trigger - Trigger, the smartest horse in the movies.
George "Gabby" Hayes - Gabby Whittaker
Dale Evans - Connie Edwards
Carol Hughes - Jan Holloway
George Meeker - Steve McClory
Lanny Rees - Duke Lowery
Ruby Dandridge - Devoria - the cook
George Lloyd - Sheriff
Arthur Space - Coroner Jud judnick
Frank Reicher - Jason (lawyer)
George Carleton - Kennedy (newspaper editor)
Flying 'L' Ranch Quartet - singers (as Flying 'L' Ranch Quartette)
Bob Nolan - Bob
Sons of the Pioneers - Musicians, ranch hands

External links

 
 

1946 films
Republic Pictures films
1946 Western (genre) films
American Western (genre) films
American black-and-white films
Films directed by William Witney
1940s English-language films
1940s American films